Dumplin' is a 2018 American coming-of-age comedy film directed by Anne Fletcher and written by Kristin Hahn. It is based on the young adult novel of the same name by Julie Murphy. The film stars Danielle Macdonald as Willowdean "Dumplin'" Dickson, Jennifer Aniston as her mother, Rosie Dickson, and Odeya Rush as her best friend, Ellen Dryver.

Plot 

Willowdean "Will" Dickson grows up in a small Texas town, raised primarily by her Aunt Lucy. Her mother Rosie – who calls her "Dumplin’", much to Will’s chagrin – is a former beauty queen, too committed to various pageants to spend time with her daughter, and remains the planner of the town's annual Miss Teen Bluebonnet Pageant.

Lucy introduces Will to Ellen Dryver, who becomes her best friend. Six months before they start their final year of high school, Lucy dies. Rosie finds difficulty connecting with Will, who often feels judged about her weight and is embarrassed by her mother's pageant world.

On the first day of school, Will is suspended for defending another overweight girl, Millie Mitchellchuck, from a bully. Will accuses Rosie of resenting her for her looks, and is upset when Rosie states Lucy should have taken better care of her health. After finding Lucy's application for the Miss Teen Bluebonnet Pageant when she was 16, Will enters the pageant as an act of "protest in heels". Ellen signs up as well, along with the enthusiastic Millie and their classmate Hannah Perez, an edgy feminist.

Rosie interprets Will's application as a mockery of the pageant, and warns her that pageants are harder than she thinks. Will becomes jealous when Ellen warms to the pageant and the other contestants, and they quarrel after she tells her to quit.

Bo, who works with Will at the local diner, asks her out to watch a meteor shower. They kiss, but Will panics when Bo innocently touches her back, and leaves abruptly. She feels further alienated when Rosie mentors Bekah Colter, the pageant frontrunner, who plans to ask Bo to the Sadie Hawkins dance.

After finding a flyer for a bar Lucy frequented, Will takes Millie and Hannah to the bar’s Dolly Parton-themed drag show, where she meets Lee Wayne, a drag queen, who was a close friend of Lucy’s.

During the pageant talent tryouts, Will's choice to perform a magic trick goes poorly. Bo confesses his feelings for Will, having declined to go with Bekah to the dance, but she is quick to question his attraction; hurt, he accuses her of caring too much about what others think.

Grappling with her insecurities, Will is finally able to revisit the childhood playroom she shared with Ellen and Lucy. Rediscovering a special brooch among Lucy’s belongings, Will is inspired to take the pageant seriously, and she, Millie, and Hannah are coached by Lee and his friends. At the preliminary pageant event, Rosie is impressed by Will's speech about loyalty, which leads Will and Ellen to repair their friendship. At home, Rosie and Will reconcile over memories of Lucy, and Rosie regrets asking Will to donate Lucy’s things, having given “too much of her away”.

At the pageant, Millie is confronted by her mother for lying about entering the competition, but Millie stands firm. Will incorporates a Dolly Parton tribute into her magic act, to the joy of the audience and her mother; Millie’s performance is also a success. While Rosie is overwhelmed with pride, she is compelled to disqualify Will for unapproved changes to her costume and song, unable to make an exception for her daughter. When Ellen's boyfriend is unable to escort her for the formalwear presentation, Rosie suggests Will does so, allowing them to complete the pageant together. Bekah wins the pageant as expected, but Millie is awarded first runner-up, while Will leaves to reconcile with Bo, and they share another kiss. The movie ends as Will and her friends take Rosie and Millie's mother to the bar where Aunt Lucy brought so much joy.

Cast 

Dumplin author Julie Murphy makes a cameo as a patron at the drag bar.

 Production 
On March 15, 2017, Jennifer Aniston was announced in the cast of Dumplin, playing Rosie Dickson, the mother of Dumplin'. On June 13, 2017 Danielle Macdonald joined Aniston, in the lead role. On August 15, 2017, Odeya Rush was also cast in the film to play Ellen "El" Dryver, Willowdean's best friend, who creates difficulties when she tries to enter the beauty pageant along with Will. On August 21, 2017, Dove Cameron, Luke Benward, Bex Taylor-Klaus, Maddie Baillio, Georgie Flores, and Ginger Minj joined the cast of Dumplin'''.

Principal photography on the film began on August 21, 2017, in Covington, Georgia and ended in October.

Release
In September 2018, Netflix acquired distribution rights to the film. Dumplin was released on December 7, 2018 on the platform.

Reception
The website's critical consensus reads, "Elevated by a solid soundtrack and a terrific cast, Dumplin'' offers sweetly uplifting drama that adds just enough new ingredients to a reliably comforting formula." On Metacritic, the film has a weighted average score of 53 out of 100, based on 16 critics, indicating "mixed or average reviews".

Accolades

Soundtrack

The soundtrack, released on November 30, 2018, features songs either written or recorded by country star Dolly Parton. Parton performs on every song on the album and wrote six of the 12 tracks exclusively for the film, with the remaining six being re-recordings of some of Parton's earlier hits, including a string version of "Jolene". Joining Parton on the soundtrack are Elle King, Miranda Lambert, Mavis Staples, Alison Krauss, Rhonda Vincent, Sia, Macy Gray, Willa Amai and the film's stars Aniston and Macdonald.

References

External links 
 

2010s feminist films
2010s female buddy films
2010s musical comedy films
2010s coming-of-age comedy films
Echo Films films
American female buddy films
American musical comedy films
Films directed by Anne Fletcher
Films produced by Jennifer Aniston
Films set in Texas
Films shot in Georgia (U.S. state)
English-language Netflix original films
Films about beauty pageants
Films based on young adult literature
2018 comedy films
Films scored by Jake Monaco
2010s English-language films
2010s American films